The Autovía A-31, also known as the Autovía de Alicante, is a highway in Spain.  The road connects Madrid to Alicante.

It starts at a junction with the Autovía A-3 at Alarcón and heads south east to Albacete.  Thereafter the Autovía A-30 branches off to Murcia.  The A-31 heads east to Almansa and a junction with the Autovía A-35 before heading to the coast the Autovía A-7 and Alicante.

References

A-31
A-31
A-31
A-31